William McCullough may refer to:

 William McCullough (loyalist) (1949–1981), Northern Irish loyalist paramilitary with the Ulster Defence Association
 William McCullough (Northern Ireland politician) (1901-1967), Northern Irish communist and trade unionist
 William McCullough (New Zealand politician) (1843–1925), New Zealand politician
 Billy McCullough (born 1935), Northern Irish footballer